Clepsicosma is a genus of moths in the family Crambidae. As at 2022, this genus contains only one described species, Clepsicosma iridia, which is endemic to New Zealand. The species inhabits native forest in the North Island as well as the northern and western parts of the South Island down to Westland. The larval host of this species is assumed to be species of Cutty grass, possibly including Gahnia setifolia and Gahnia xanthocarpa, although the life history of this species is unknown.  The adults of C. iridia are on the wing from December until May. They are nocturnal, and are attracted to light. During the day the adults rest on the underside of leaves, including those Cutty grass species that may possibly be their larval hosts.

Taxonomy 

The genus and species were described by Edward Meyrick in 1888 using one female specimen collected in December in the Waitākere Ranges in the Auckland District. George Hudson discussed and illustrated this species in his 1928 book The butterflies and moths of New Zealand. The female holotype specimen is held at the Natural History Museum, London. The epithet iridia derives from the Roman goddess of rainbows, Iris. The name refers to the wavy line of iridescent scales on the forewing of this species.

As at 2022 there exists an undescribed Clepiscosma species that has been collected at Whakaruangangana and Ngawha as well as at coastal localites in Northland and in Auckland.

Description 

Meyrick described the genus as follows:

Hudson described the species as follows:

Distribution 
This species is endemic to New Zealand. It has been observed in the North Island and in the northern and western parts of the South Island down to Westland. This species is regarded as being common.

Habitat and hosts 
 
C. iridia inhabits native forest. The larval host of this species is assumed to be species of Cutty grass but as at 2014 this moth has not been reared in captivity to confirm this assumption. Hudson stated that the species was common amongst Gahnia setifolia. Hoare noted that this species is also associated with Gahnia xanthocarpa.

Behaviour
The adult moths can be observed from late December until May. They are nocturnal and are attracted to light. During daylight hours they rest on the underside of leaves and have been found hiding amongst G. setifolia leaves near the ground.

References

Acentropinae
Taxa named by Edward Meyrick
Monotypic moth genera
Moths of New Zealand
Endemic fauna of New Zealand
Crambidae genera
Endemic moths of New Zealand